

Cory Kruseman (born September 20, 1970) is an American racing driver. A two-time Chili Bowl champion in midget car racing, he has also competed in the NASCAR Craftsman Truck Series and the Firestone Indy Racing League.

Personal life 
Born in Ventura, California, Kruseman was married, to Carri, and has one daughter. He currently operates the Cory Kruseman Sprint Car and Midget Driving School. He is a graduate of Buena High School.

Racing career 
Kruseman has raced for most of his career in midget and sprint cars, racing in United States Auto Club (USAC) and Sprint Car Racing Association (SCRA) competition. A serious accident in 1995 nearly ended Kruseman's career, but after six months of rehabilitation he returned to racing.

Kruseman won the famous Chili Bowl midget car race in 2000; in 2004 he was champion of the event for a second time. Kruseman was also the 2001 SCRA Champion, and the 2002 USAC Indiana Sprint Week Championship champion.

In 2002, Kruseman made one start each in the NASCAR Craftsman Truck Series at Phoenix International Raceway, where he finished 31st, and in the Firestone Indy Racing League at Texas Motor Speedway, finishing 26th. Kruseman also attempted to qualify for Craftsman Truck Series races at Homestead-Miami Speedway in 2002, and at Phoenix in 2003, but failed to qualify for either race.

A frequent visitor to Australia to race Midgets (known as Speedcars down under), Kruseman won the 2002/03 Australian Speedcar Championship at the Speedway City in Adelaide.

Motorsports career results

NASCAR
(key) (Bold – Pole position awarded by qualifying time. Italics – Pole position earned by points standings or practice time. * – Most laps led.)

Craftsman Truck Series

American open–wheel racing results
(key) (Races in bold indicate pole position)

IndyCar Series

References

External links

Living people
1970 births
People from Ventura, California
Racing drivers from California
IndyCar Series drivers
NASCAR drivers
Sportspeople from Ventura County, California
USAC Silver Crown Series drivers
PDM Racing drivers